Zemlyansky, female form Zemlyanska, is a Russian surname. Notable people with the surname include:

Vyacheslav Zemlyansky (born 1986), Russian footballer

See also
 Zemlyansk

Russian-language surnames